Zoubir Bachi (born January 12, 1950) is a retired Algerian football player. He spent the majority of his career with his hometown club of MC Alger, whom he helped win a historic treble in 1976 (Algerian League, Algerian Cup and African Cup Of Champions Clubs), even scoring a goal in the final of the 1976 African Cup of Champions Clubs. He was also an Algerian international and had 5 caps for the Algerian National Team.

Honours
 Won the Algerian Championnat National three times with MC Alger in 1972, 1975 and 1976
 Won the Algerian Cup three times with MC Alger in 1975, 1976 and 1978
 Won the Maghreb Cup Winners Cup two times with MC Alger in 1971 and 1974
 Won the African Cup Of Champions Clubs once with MC Alger in 1976

References

1950 births
Algeria international footballers
Algeria youth international footballers
Algerian expatriate footballers
Algerian expatriate sportspeople in Belgium
Algerian footballers
Belgian Pro League players
Expatriate footballers in Belgium
JS El Biar players
MC Alger players
R. Charleroi S.C. players
People from El Biar
Living people
Association football midfielders
21st-century Algerian people